Scream is the fourth album by German trance producer & DJ Markus Schulz, released on August 31, 2012 by Armada Music. Scream represents a change in Markus Schulz's production style from deeper trance tracks produced since Do You Dream? to more club orientated trance tracks, which are widely featured throughout the entirety of Scream.

Track listing

Charts

References

External links

2012 albums
Armada Music albums

pl:Do You Dream?
ru:Do You Dream?